Ralph Goodwin (by 1505 – 1562), of Ipswich, Suffolk, was an English politician.

He was a Member of Parliament (MP) for Ipswich in 1542 and November 1554.

References

1562 deaths
Members of the Parliament of England (pre-1707) for Ipswich
English MPs 1542–1544
English MPs 1554–1555
Year of birth uncertain